Depler Springs is an unincorporated community in Fulton County, Illinois, United States. Depler Springs is near Illinois Route 97, between Cuba and Lewistown.

References

Unincorporated communities in Fulton County, Illinois
Unincorporated communities in Illinois